The 1953 All-Ireland Minor Football Championship was the 22nd staging of the All-Ireland Minor Football Championship, the Gaelic Athletic Association's premier inter-county Gaelic football tournament for boys under the age of 18.

Galway entered the championship as defending champions, however, they were defeated in the Connacht Championship.

On 27 September 1953, Mayo won the championship following a 2-11 to 1-6 defeat of Clare in the All-Ireland final. This was their second All-Ireland title overall and their first in fifteen championship seasons.

Results

Connacht Minor Football Championship

Munster Minor Football Championship

Leinster Minor Football Championship

Ulster Minor Football Championship

All-Ireland Minor Football Championship

Semi-finals

Final

Championship statistics

Miscellaneous

 Clare win the Munster Championship for the first time since 1930.

References

1953
All-Ireland Minor Football Championship